Qovaq or Qavaq, also known as Qaraq, may refer to:
 Qovaq-e Olya (disambiguation)
 Qovaq-e Sofla (disambiguation)